German submarine U-292 was a Type VIIC/41 U-boat of Nazi Germany's Kriegsmarine during World War II.

She was laid down on 12 November 1942 by the Vegesacker Werft (yard) at Bremen-Vegesack as yard number 57, launched on 20 July 1943, and commissioned on 25 August with Oberleutnant zur See Werner Schmidt in command.

She was sunk by a British aircraft, west of Trondheim on 27 May 1944.

In one patrol, she sank or damaged no ships.

Design
German Type VIIC/41 submarines were preceded by the shorter Type VIIB submarines. U-292 had a displacement of  when at the surface and  while submerged. She had two shafts and two  propellers.

U-292 was fitted with five  torpedo tubes (four fitted at the bow and one at the stern), fourteen torpedoes, one  SK C/35 naval gun, (220 rounds), one  Flak M42 and two  C/30 anti-aircraft guns. The boat had a complement of between forty-four and sixty.

Service history

The boat's service life began with training with the 8th U-boat Flotilla in August 1943. She was then transferred to the 1st flotilla for operations on 1 May 1944.

Patrol and loss
Having carried out a series of short voyages from Kiel and Larvik in Norway, the submarine departed Bergen (also in Norway) on 24 May 1944. On the 27th, she was sunk by depth charges dropped from Liberator S of No. 59 Squadron RAF west of Trondheim in position .

Fifty-one men died; there were no survivors.

See also
 Battle of the Atlantic (1939-1945)

References

Bibliography

German Type VIIC/41 submarines
U-boats commissioned in 1943
U-boats sunk by British aircraft
U-boats sunk by depth charges
1943 ships
World War II submarines of Germany
World War II shipwrecks in the Norwegian Sea
Ships built in Bremen (state)
Ships lost with all hands
U-boats sunk in 1944
Maritime incidents in May 1944